Bernhard "Berni" Klodt (26 October 1926 – 23 May 1996) was a German football player. He was born in Gelsenkirchen-Bismarck; the goalkeeper Hans Klodt was his brother.

Football career
In his club career, Klodt played mainly for FC Schalke 04. He debuted in the senior team of the club on 17 January 1943 at the age of 16, where he scored a goal in a 6–2 victory over Westfalia Herne.

Aged 36, Klodt ended his career in 1963 with the start of the Bundesliga. In his last game, he scored the only goal in Schalke's 1–0 victory against the Bulgarian national team on 18 June 1963. He played in 330 Oberliga West games in which he scored 129 goals.

Between 1950 and 1959, Klodt played 19 times and scored three goals for the Germany national football team. He was part of the 1954 FIFA World Cup-winning squad, and also played in the 1958 FIFA World Cup.

During the 1954 World Cup, Klodt had started in the outside right position instead of Helmut Rahn. He played in both games against Turkey. Although he played fairly well in both games, Sepp Herberger decided to replace him with Rahn for the quarterfinal against Yugoslavia. Herberger's decision at first was not exclusively greeted with enthusiasm by the press, but after Rahn had scored against Yugoslavia, Klodt was out of the team for good. The basis for Herberger's decision was his hope that Rahn with his unconventional style and shooting prowess was more likely to turn around a game than any other player. Contrary to Rahn, Klodt was said to be less of an individualist and more of a teamplayer.

After football
After his retirement from football, Klodt among other things coached the youth team of FC Schalke 04 and also worked as salesman for a brewery. After suffering a heart attack and a stroke in 1990, he was paralysed from the right.

Career statistics

Club
Ref.

International

Honours

Club
Schalke 04
German Championship: 1958

International
West Germany
 FIFA World Cup: 1954

References

External links
 
 
 

1926 births
1996 deaths
German footballers
Germany international footballers
FC Schalke 04 players
1954 FIFA World Cup players
1958 FIFA World Cup players
FIFA World Cup-winning players
Association football forwards
STV Horst-Emscher players
Sportspeople from Gelsenkirchen
Footballers from North Rhine-Westphalia
West German footballers